Herbert Siegert (8 February 1920 – December 2008) was a German football manager.

Siegert led both Tennis Borussia Berlin and SpVgg Blau-Weiß 1890 Berlin to championship titles in the second tier Regionalliga in 1965 and 1973 respectively.

References 

 

1920 births
2008 deaths
German football managers
Tennis Borussia Berlin managers